Wrociszów  is a village in the administrative district of Gmina Nowa Sól, within Nowa Sól County, Lubusz Voivodeship, in western Poland.

References

Villages in Nowa Sól County